Bruce Delavere (1908-1985) was an Australian rugby league footballer who played in the 1930s.

A St. George Dragons lower grade player, Bruce Delavere played first grade in 1936, before retiring to a cricket and rugby league career on the N.S.W. south coast.

Bruce Delavere died on 18 November 1985 aged 77.

References

St. George Dragons players
Australian rugby league players
1908 births
1985 deaths
Rugby league players from Sydney
Rugby league wingers